Pinghu South railway station is a freight handling station in Shenzhen, China.

History
The first phase of a new road-to-rail container terminal, comprising two railway lines, opened at the station on 28 July 2020.

Location
The station is situated on the Guangzhou–Shenzhen railway south of the Pinghu railway station. Two branch lines (Pinghu–Nanshan railway and Pinghu–Yantian railway) start here. Additionally there is a chord between the Xiamen–Shenzhen railway and the Guangzhou–Shenzhen railway south of this station.

References

Railway stations in Guangdong